Viridrillia williami is a species of sea snail, a marine gastropod mollusk in the family Pseudomelatomidae, the turrids and allies.

Description
The length of the shell attains 10 mm.

Distribution
This marine species occurs off Florida and in the Caribbean Sea at depths between 27 m and 174 m.

References

 Bartsch, P. 1943. A review of some West Atlantic turritid mollusks Memorias de la Sociedad Cubana de Historia Natural 17 81-122, pls. 7-15.

External links
 Rosenberg G., Moretzsohn F. & García E. F. (2009). Gastropoda (Mollusca) of the Gulf of Mexico, Pp. 579–699 in Felder, D.L. and D.K. Camp (eds.), Gulf of Mexico–Origins, Waters, and Biota. Biodiversity. Texas A&M Press, College Station, Texas
 
 

williami
Gastropods described in 1943